This is a list of institutions subordinated to the Government of Romania. The ones that appear in bold are coordinated by the Chancellery of the Prime Minister; the rest are coordinated by the General Secretary of the Government.

Authorities

 National Authority for Consumer Protection (Autoritatea Naţională pentru Protecţia Consumatorilor)
 Authority for State Assets Recovery (Autoritatea pentru Valorificarea Activelor Statului)
 National Authority for the Protection of the Rights of the Child (Autoritatea Naţională pentru Protecţia Drepturilor Copilului)
 National Authority for Disabled Persons (Autoritatea Naţională pentru Persoanele cu Handicap)
 National Regulatory Authority for Communications (Autoritatea Naţională de Reglementare în Comunicaţii)
 National Authority for the Regulation and Monitoring of Public Procurement (Autoritatea Naţională pentru Reglementarea şi Monitorizarea Achizţiilor Publice)
 National Authority for Youth (Autoritatea Naţională pentru Tineret)
 National Authority for Sanitary Veterinary Care and Food Safety (Autoritatea Naţională Sanitară Veterinară şi pentru Siguranţa Alimentelor)
 National Authority for Regulating Public Communal Administration Services (Autoritatea Naţională de Reglementare pentru Serviciile Publice de Gospodărie Comunală)

Agencies
 Directorate for Investigating Organized Crime and Terrorism (DIICOT) 
 Romanian Agency for Foreign Investments (Agentia Română pentru Investiţii Străine) 
 National Agency for Sports (Agenţia Naţională pentru Sport)
 Agency for Government Strategies (Agenţia pentru Strategii Guvernamentale)
 National Agency for Small and Medium Sized Enterprises and Cooperatives (Agenţia Naţională pentru Întreprinderi Mici şi Mijlocii şi Cooperaţie)
 Nuclear Agency (Agenţia Nucleară)
 Romanian National Anti-Doping Agency (Agenţia Naţională Anti-Doping)

Institutes

 National Institute of Statistics (Institutul Naţional de Statistică)
 Institute for the Investigation of Communist Crimes in Romania (Institutul de Investigare a Crimelor Comunismului)

Inspectorates

 General Inspectorate for Communications and Information Technology (Inspectoratul General pentru Comunicaţii şi Tehnologia Informaţiei)
 State Inspectorate in Constructions (Inspectoratul de Stat în Construcţii - ISC)

Offices

 National Office for Prevention and Control of Money Laundering (Oficiul Naţional de Prevenire şi Combatere a Spălării Banilor)
 State Office for Inventions and Trademarks (Oficiul de Stat pentru Invenţii şi Mărci)
 Romanian Office for Copyright (Oficiul Român pentru Drepturile de Autor)
 Central State Office for Special Problems (Oficiul Central de Stat pentru Probleme Speciale (OCSPS))
 National Registry Office for Classified Information (Oficiul Registrului Naţional al Informaţiilor Secrete de Stat)
 Romanian Office for Adoptions (Oficiului Român pentru Adopţii)

Commissions

 National Forecast Commission (Comisia Naţională de Prognoză)
 National Commission for Nuclear Activities Control (Comisia Naţională pentru Controlul Activităţilor Nucleare)

Television and Radio

Romanian Radio Broadcasting Company(Societatea Română de Radiodifuziune)
Romanian Television(Societatea Română de Televiziune or SRTv)

Other institutions

 National Administration of the State's Reserves (Administraţia Naţională a Rezervelor de Stat)
 National Customs Authority (Direcţia Generală a Vămilor)
 State Secretary for the Problems of the December 1989 Revolutionaries (Secretariatul de Stat pentru Problemele Revolutionarilor din Decembrie 1989)

Politics of Romania